Tillandsia taxcoensis is a species of flowering plant in the genus Tillandsia. This species is endemic to Mexico. It was discovered in the Mexican State of Morelos.

References

taxcoensis
Flora of Mexico